Events from the year 1734 in Canada.

Incumbents
French Monarch: Louis XV
British and Irish Monarch: George II

Governors
Governor General of New France: Charles de la Boische, Marquis de Beauharnois
Colonial Governor of Louisiana: Jean-Baptiste le Moyne de Bienville
Governor of Nova Scotia: Lawrence Armstrong
Commodore-Governor of Newfoundland: Edward Falkingham

Events
 Jean Baptiste de La Vérendrye establishes the first Fort Maurepas on the Red River about five leagues south of Lake Winnipeg, third of the main La Vérendrye posts. (Fort Saint Pierre on Rainy River; reactivated; Fort St. Charles on Lake of the Woods.)
 A Montreal slave named Marie-Joseph Angelique learns that she is to be sold to someone else. Possibly, to obscure her attempt to escape, she may have set fire to the house of her mistress, Thérèse de Couagne. The fire could not be contained, causing damage to half of Old Montreal. She was charged, tried and hanged, bringing attention to the conditions of the slaves.

Births

Deaths
June 21: Marie-Josèphe-Angélique, accused of setting a fire in April that burned part of Montréal.

Historical documents
Report of governor and intendant of Canada on Montreal fire for which enslaved Black woman "Angélique" was convicted and hanged

Jesuit priest describes fellow passengers on 80-day voyage to Canada, including louse-covered soldiers and transported criminals

Photo: Mauvide-Genest Manor on St. Lawrence River, built ca. 1734

Nova Scotia governor pronounces Acadians "proud, lazy, obstinate and untractable people, unskillful in the methods of Agriculture," etc.

Possible war with France leaves N.S. exposed to Île-Royale, Canada, Indigenous people and even oath-taking Acadians (Note: "savages" used)

Reacting to Indigenous people's complaints about lack of gifts, Gov. Philipps argues at length that they are not deserved

Nova Scotia Council decides it's good policy to accept oath of allegiance from "an half Indian" who is "an Active man amongst the Indians"

Nova Scotia lieutenant governor says Annapolis River highlands are "of a thin sandy soil" and not worth "inclosing"

Previously resisted by landowners in its path, order reissued for construction of road from Annapolis Royal to Minas

French deputies are to watch for "frauds" that are of "great prejudice of His Majesty's customs" at Saint John River and elsewhere

Council sentences man to fifty lashes with cat o' nine tails for stealing £3 note, and orders him to return money

Woman sentenced to ducking after she falsely charges murder against another woman, who gets sentence reduced to apology at church door

Bowling green opposite Fort Anne to be reserved for garrison officers and "all Other Gentlemen who may please to Contribute"

Regarding suspension of Council member, Lt. Gov. Armstrong is advised "not to be too nice or extreme in the infancy of a Colony"

Newfoundland defences are so weak that "a sloop of ten gunns and fifty men may take any harbour in the land," and 20 soldiers take St. John's

Newfoundland survey answers are much like last year's (when stated at all), except facts about Port aux Basques and its dangerous coast

William Taverner points out illegal fish, game and fur activity in Port aux Basques area by Île-Royale debtors, thieves and Indigenous people

Capt. Taverner warns that Innu (Montagnais) cross in boats to northwestern Newfoundland from New France every winter to take furs

"Alarmed with the Movements of the French and Indians on the Frontiers," New York Assembly appropriates money for fortifications

Kanien’kéhà:ka sachems remind New York governor that Albany tried to steal their land, and want him to accept that land in trust

Governor Cosby reports trusteeship of Kanien’kéhà:ka land, asserting deal's importance to Covenant Chain alliance with Six Nations

Petitioners want to settle Mohawk River tract that is "uninhabited, except by natives who are inconsiderable in number" and "friendly"

Gov. Cosby recommends sending smiths to maintain Six Nations' arms, as French do that and also provide lead, gunpowder and brandy

Virginia lieutenant governor wants settlement beyond mountains to thwart French incursions and, with control of Great Lakes, to split New France

New Hampshire seeks relief from debt of "long and destructive Indian warr" and its "expeditions against the French at Nova Scotia and Canada"

Legal advice: reject petition similar to those of Cabot and Raleigh "for propagating the Christian religion by very unchristian methods"

Linkage: ship arrives in Boston from Annapolis Royal where sloop from Louisbourg had news via ship from France of great battle on Rhine River

References 

 
Canada
34